Road P-64 is a motor road of regional significance in Ukraine. Passes through the territory of the Kyiv and Cherkasy regions.

Whole length 

Main route 

Route map :

Notes

References
 
 
 
 

Roads in Cherkasy Oblast
Roads in Kyiv Oblast